Some of the prehistoric archaeological sites of Iran are listed below:

Paleolithic
Hotu and Kamarband Caves
Darband Cave
Qal'eh Bozi
Do-Ashkaft Cave
Warwasi
Bisitun Cave
Kashafrud

Neolithic
 Tappeh Sialk
 Ganj Dareh
 Ali Kosh
 Hajji Firuz Tepe

Jiroft culture (3rd millennium BC)
Konar Sandal
Shahdad
Shahr-e Sukhteh

Lullubi culture (3rd to 2nd millennia BC)
Sarpol-e Zahab
 
Elam (3rd to 2nd millennia BC)
 Anshan
 Chogha Zanbil
 Godin Tepe
 Haft Tepe
 Susa
 Khorramabad

Assyria
 Tappeh Hasanlu

Median to Achaemenid period
Ecbatana
Persepolis
Behistun
Rey, Iran
Pasargadae
Temukan
Bābā Jān Tepe
Marlik
Qaleh Kesh

Sassanid period
Takht-e Soleymān
Istakhr
Great Wall of Gorgan
Qal'eh Dokhtar
Qumis, Iran

See also
List of archaeological sites sorted by country
History of Iran
 Rock art in Iran

References

External links

 
Iran
archaeological sites